Dravče is a settlement in the Municipality of Vuzenica in northern Slovenia. It has a population cluster lying on the right bank of the Drava River, and extends south and upwards, with dispersed properties in the heavily wooded Pohorje Hills. The settlement, and the municipality, are included in the Carinthia Statistical Region, which is in the Slovenian portion of the historical Duchy of Styria.

References

External links
Dravče on Geopedia

Populated places in the Municipality of Vuzenica